The following is a list of people associated with the Royal National College for the Blind.

Staff

Thomas Rhodes Armitage, Victorian philanthropist and co-founder
Francis Joseph Campbell, American anti-slavery campaigner, co-founder of RNC and its first principal
Tony Larkin, former professional footballer and England Blind Football team coach, head of sport and recreation at RNC

Patrons
Queen Victoria, the college's first Patron
Charles, Prince of Wales, current Patron since 1997

Vice patrons and other supporters

Vice patrons
Edward VII of the United Kingdom
Alexandra of Denmark
Alfred, Duke of Saxe-Coburg and Gotha
Grand Duchess Maria Alexandrovna of Russia
Princess Louise, Duchess of Argyll

Governors
Hugh Grosvenor, 1st Duke of Westminster
Anthony Ashley-Cooper, 7th Earl of Shaftesbury
Thomas Anson, 2nd Earl of Lichfield
Right Hon. W. H. Smith, M.P.
Sir John Terry, film financier and manager of the National Film Finance Corporation

Other supporters
Susan Bligh, Countess of Darnley, current Lord Lieutenant of Herefordshire, Appeals Patron
Sir Thomas Dunne, former Lord Lieutenant of Herefordshire, Appeals Patron
Des Kelly, Daily Mail columnist and BBC Sports presenter, patron of the England Blind Football team
Gabby Logan, BBC Sports presenter, patron of the England Blind Football team

Presidents and vice presidents

Current president
The Hon. Mrs Jessica White

Current vice presidents
Archbishop of Canterbury
Archbishop of York
Archbishop of Westminster
Patricia Knatchbull, 2nd Countess Mountbatten of Burma
Michael Buerk
Lord Mayor of London (ex officio)
Paul Keetch, former MP for Hereford (ex officio)
Master of the Worshipful Company of Musicians (ex officio)

Alumni
David Blunkett, British Labour Party politician and former Home Secretary
Alfred Hollins, English composer and organist
William Henry Jackson, Anglican priest, missionary and inventor of Burmese Braille
Anthony Kappes, Paralympic cyclist
Ryan Kelly, actor; in 1997 became the first completely blind student to join the Bristol Old Vic Theatre School; plays Jack 'Jazzer' McCreary in Radio 4's The Archers

References

Royal National College for the Blind
Royal National Collge for the Blind